Bruce Thomson (19 November 1930 - 13 January 2020) is a former Scotland international rugby union player. Thomson played as a Prop. He was a noted bagpiper.

Rugby union career

Amateur career

Thomson played rugby for Oxford University.

He later played rugby for London Scottish.

International career
He was capped for  3 times in 1953.

Outside of rugby

Medical career

Thomson became a doctor. He became a GP in Horsham, Sussex.

He retired to Crieff in Perthshire.
He died in Crieff on 13 January 2020.

Bagpipes

Thomson learned the bagpipes at Aberdeen Grammar School.

After school he joined the army where he was taught by Pipe Major Donald McLeod. He has composed more than 450 bagpipe tunes and has performed for the Queen.

He has also been influenced by Seumas MacNeill, Pipe Major Brian McRae and the members of The Royal Scottish Pipers Society.

He has now published several books of his bagpipe tunes.

References

1930 births
Living people
Scottish rugby union players
Scotland international rugby union players
Rugby union props
London Scottish F.C. players
Oxford University RFC players
Sportspeople from Assam